Love's Option is a 1928 British silent adventure film directed by George Pearson and starring Dorothy Boyd, Patrick Aherne and James Carew. It was made at Cricklewood Studios based on the novel The Riddle by Douglas Newton. The film was distributed by Paramount Pictures' British subsidiary, enabling the company to meet its yearly quota set down by the British government. The film follows several rivals attempting to gain control of a valuable Spanish copper mine. It was known by the alternative title A Girl of Today.

Cast
 Dorothy Boyd as Dorothy 
 Patrick Aherne as John Dacre
 James Carew as Simon Wake 
 Henry Vibart as Lucien Wake 
 Scotch Kelly as Pat Kelly 
 Philip Hewland as Tom Bartlett 
 Cecil Barry

References

Bibliography
 Chibnall, Steve. Quota Quickies: The Birth of the British 'B' film. British Film Institute, 2007.
 Low, Rachel. The History of British Film: Volume IV, 1918–1929. Routledge, 1997.

External links

1928 films
British adventure films
British silent feature films
1928 adventure films
1920s English-language films
Films directed by George Pearson
Films shot at Cricklewood Studios
British black-and-white films
1920s British films
Silent adventure films